KKTS-FM (99.3 FM) is a radio station broadcasting a Hot Adult Contemporary format. Licensed to Douglas, Wyoming, United States, the station is locally owned and operated by Douglas Broadcasting and features programming from NBC Radio and Westwood One. HitRadio KKTS also broadcasts on KKTS-AM 1580 and 107.3FM in Casper, Wyoming.

History
The station went on the air as KKTY-FM on May 1, 1992. On September 1, 1992, the station changed its call sign to KWOG-FM. On December 2, 1993, it changed again to KKTY-FM, and on May 2, 2011, to the current KKTS-FM. KKTS also began broadcasting on AM 1580 and 107.3 FM in Casper, Wyoming in 2013.

References

External links

KTS-FM
Douglas, Wyoming